Razan (also Romanized as Rāzān) is a village in Razan Rural District, Zagheh District, Khorramabad County, Lorestan Province, Iran. At the 2006 census, its population was 1,757, in 423 families.

References 

Towns and villages in Khorramabad County